Down to Earth is a 2001 American fantasy comedy film directed by Chris and Paul Weitz and written by Chris Rock, Lance Crouther, Ali LeRoi and Louis C.K. It is a remake of the 1978 film Heaven Can Wait, which is based on the 1938 stage play of the same name by Harry Segall. The film stars Chris Rock as Lance Barton, a comedian who is killed before his time on Earth is through. He is given another chance to continue his life, but in the body of a rich middle-aged white man.

The film was released on February 16, 2001, and grossed $71 million against its $30 million budget.

Plot
Lance Barton is a struggling comedian who is quite funny and confident in his personality, but is unable to bring his talent across in front of an audience. After being booed off stage one night, he hears about an opportunity from his manager, Whitney Daniels at the Apollo Theater, which is having a farewell show due to its imminent closing. He is hoping to get a chance to prove himself in front of a real audience, when on his way home riding a bike, Lance is distracted by Sontee Jenkins. He is hit by a truck and is instantly killed.

Lance is brought up to Heaven, where he meets the angels, King and Keyes, who reveal that Lance has been taken before his time, and  though his body had been destroyed by the truck, they can help Lance return to Earth. After sorting through many bodies, they find Charles Wellington III, an extremely rich businessman freshly drowned in his tub by his wife and assistant, Winston Sklar. Lance is reluctant until he discovers that Sontee, the woman he saw before his death, is protesting Charles by handcuffing herself to a coffee table in his penthouse, demanding Charles' presence. Seeing this as a chance to get to know her, Lance makes a deal with King to temporarily lend Charles' body until a more suitable body is found. Soon after, Charles returns from death, but with the witty soul of Lance inside him. Everyone except for the angels and him sees him as the middle-aged, rich, white Charles.

Although Charles was unpopular in the past, the public and those closest to Charles start to notice a change in his personality. He transforms from a snobbish billionaire to a philanthropist, including giving the maid Wanda a raise. Despite recent events, Lance continues to follow his comedy dreams through Charles, contacting his old manager Whitney and convincing him that he is Lance reincarnated. Through many humorous moments and issues, he gets Sontee to fall in love with him.

All too soon, Charles is murdered by a hired assassin. Fulfilling the deal Lance and King set up earlier, King and Keyes then send Lance to return yet again to Earth as Joe Guy, a great comedian and more acceptable candidate, who will die in a car accident. Joe returns from this accident unscathed, now with Lance's soul.

After pulling off a successful performance at the Apollo and reconnecting with Whitney, King and Keyes inform Lance that after their current conversation, he will not remember them or his past lives, but his personality will remain. After they leave, he reconnects with Whitney again, and proceeds to get Sontee to fall in love with him again, after meeting her in the theater for the first time as Joe Guy.

Cast
 Chris Rock as Lance Barton
 Regina King as Sontee Jenkins
 Mark Addy as Cisco
 Eugene Levy as Keyes
 Frankie Faison as Whitney Daniels
 Greg Germann as Winston Sklar
 Jennifer Coolidge as Mrs. Wellington
 Chazz Palminteri as King
 Wanda Sykes as Wanda
 John Cho as Phil Quon
 Mario Joyner as Apollo M.C.
 Arnold Pinnock as Joe Guy
 Brian Rhodes as Charles Wellington III
 Saul Medina as Background Extra
 Telma Hopkins as Woman in Audience (uncredited)
 Mustafa Shakir as Doorman (uncredited)

Reception
On Rotten Tomatoes, the film has a score of 20% based on reviews from 96 critics, with the consensus: "A toned down Chris Rock fails to bring a limp script to life as the movie moves from one gag to the next." At Metacritic, which assigns a weighted average score out of 100 to reviews from mainstream critics, the film received an average score of 34 based on 28 reviews, indicating "generally unfavorable reviews".

Box office
The film grossed $64.2 million in the United States, plus $7 million outside the US, for a combined gross of $71.2 million.

Soundtrack

A soundtrack containing hip hop and R&B music was released on 20 February 2001 by Sony Music Entertainment. It peaked at 71 on the Billboard 200 and 64 on the Top R&B/Hip-Hop Albums.

See also
 List of films about angels

References

External links
 
 

2001 films
2000s fantasy comedy films
2001 romantic comedy films
African-American comedy films
American fantasy comedy films
Films about Christianity
Remakes of American films
American romantic comedy films
American romantic fantasy films
Body swapping in films
2000s English-language films
Films about the afterlife
Films about reincarnation
Films based on adaptations
Religious comedy films
Films directed by Chris Weitz
Films directed by Paul Weitz
Films produced by James Jacks
Films produced by Sean Daniel
Films scored by Jamshied Sharifi
Films set in New York City
Films with screenplays by Chris Rock
Films with screenplays by Louis C.K.
Village Roadshow Pictures films
Paramount Pictures films
Films set in heaven
Films with screenplays by Ali LeRoi
2000s American films